Cholangiopancreatography can refer to:
 Endoscopic retrograde cholangiopancreatography
 Magnetic resonance cholangiopancreatography